The Manx Aviation and Military Museum is a museum dedicated to the history of aviation and the military on the Isle of Man. The museum is open at the weekends throughout the year and every day from late May to the end of September. Visits at other times and guided tours can be arranged by appointment. Entry to the museum is free. The Museum was opened on Remembrance Day (11 November) 2000.

The museum is located in Castletown, Isle of Man right next to Ronaldsway Airport to the south of the island on the main Douglas - Castletown road.

On display amongst the many pieces of wartime memorabilia is one of only a handful of fully restored Morris-Commercial C9/B self-propelled Bofors 40 mm guns.

Other displays cover RAF Jurby and RAF Andreas, the Isle of Man Home Guard, the history of Manx Airlines and a series of small exhibits called "One Man's War" which give brief details of the military service of named individuals in the RAF, Royal Navy and Army. One of these displays is dedicated to Polish pilot Stanislaw Podobinski of 303 Squadron, RAF, who died when his Spitfire crashed into high ground on the Isle of Man.

Since 2005 the Manx Regiment have displayed their exhibits here, after the Old Comrades Association closed their separate museum at Tromode.

References

Further reading 
Aircraft Wrecks : The walker's guide : Historic crash sites on the moors and mountains of the British isles,  (Chapter 7, Isle of Man)

External links
 The Manx Aviation Preservation Society website
 Isle of Man Guide website entry

Museums in the Isle of Man
Military and war museums in the United Kingdom
Aerospace museums in the United Kingdom
Aviation in the Isle of Man
Military history of the Isle of Man